The Murkay Islets are a group of several small rocky islands, some of which are joined at low tide, with a combined area of about 0.5 ha, part of Tasmania’s Trefoil Island Group, lying close to Cape Grim, Tasmania's most north-westerly point, in Bass Strait.

Fauna
The islets form part of the Hunter Island Group Important Bird Area.  Recorded breeding seabird and shorebird species include Pacific gull, silver gull, sooty oystercatcher, and Caspian tern.

References

Islands of North West Tasmania
Bass Strait
Important Bird Areas of Tasmania